The Copper Harbor Conglomerate is a geologic formation in Michigan. It is part of the larger Oronto Group and its formation dates to the Stenian period of the Proterozoic.

References
 

Stratigraphy of Michigan